Bumping into Geniuses is a book written by music manager Danny Goldberg. It describes his experience of the music industry by going through the many stages of his career from journalist to manager.

Goldberg did PR for Led Zeppelin, managed the career of Nirvana, ran Atlantic Records, Mercury Records and Warner Bros. Records.

External links 
Jody Rosen, September 19, 2008. The New York Times https://www.nytimes.com/2008/09/21/arts/21iht-idbriefs20A.16300718.html?pagewanted=all&_r=0
Chelsea Schwartz, High Voltage Magazine 

Music autobiographies